Steinfleckberg is a mountain of Bavaria, Germany.

Mountains of Bavaria
Bohemian Forest
Mountains of the Bavarian Forest